The University of California, Los Angeles School of Law (commonly UCLA Law) is the law school of the University of California, Los Angeles. 

UCLA Law has been consistently ranked by U.S. News & World Report as one of the top 20 law schools in the United States since the inception of the U.S. News rankings in 1987.

History

Founded in 1949, the UCLA School of Law is the third oldest of the five law schools within the University of California system.

In the 1930s, initial efforts to establish a law school at UCLA went nowhere as a result of resistance from UC president Robert Gordon Sproul, and because UCLA's supporters eventually refocused their efforts on first adding medical and engineering schools.

During the mid-1940s, the impetus for the creation of the UCLA School of Law emerged from outside of the UCLA community. Assemblyman William Rosenthal of Boyle Heights (on the other side of Los Angeles from UCLA) conceived of and fought for the creation of the first public law school in Southern California as a convenient and affordable alternative to the expensive private law school at USC.  Rosenthal's first attempt in 1945 failed, but his second attempt was able to gain momentum when the State Bar of California and the UCLA Alumni Association announced their support for the bill. On July 18, 1947, Governor Earl Warren authorized the appropriation of $1 million for the construction of a new law school at UCLA by signing Assembly Bill 1361 into state law.

The search for the law school's first dean was difficult and delayed its opening by a year.  UCLA's law school planning committee prioritized merit, while the then-conservative Regents of the University of California prioritized political beliefs.  Another factor was a simultaneous deanship vacancy at Berkeley Law.  Near the end of 1948, the Committee finally identified a sufficiently conservative candidate willing to take the job: L. Dale Coffman, then the dean of Vanderbilt University Law School.  The Regents believed Coffman would help bring balance to the UCLA campus, which they saw as overrun by Communists.

Coffman was able to recruit several distinguished faculty to UCLA, including Roscoe Pound, Brainerd Currie, Rollin M. Perkins, and Harold Verrall.  To build a law library, he hired Thomas S. Dabagh, then the law librarian of the Los Angeles County Law Library. The UCLA School of Law officially opened in September 1949 in temporary quarters in former military barracks behind Royce Hall, and moved into a permanent home upon the completion of the original Law Building in 1951.

Coffman's deanship did not end well, due to his vindictive and strongly prejudiced personality.  One sign of early trouble was when he drove out Dabagh in 1952 after they could not bridge their fundamental differences over how to run the law library, which was widely regarded around the UCLA community as contributing to Dabagh's early death in 1959. On September 21, 1955, the faculty revolted in the form of a memorandum to chancellor Raymond B. Allen alleging that Coffman was categorically refusing to hire Jews or anyone he perceived to be leftist, and that the school's reputation was deteriorating because Coffman's abrasive personality had led to excessive faculty turnover.  On May 24, 1956, Coffman was stripped of his deanship after a lengthy investigation by a panel of deans of his biases and his "dictatorial, undemocratic, and autocratic" management style.  He remained on the faculty until his forced retirement in 1973, but continued to face allegations as late as 1971 that he was "an unreconstructed McCarthyite and pro-segregationist."

Coffman's successor was Richard C. Maxwell, who served as the second dean of UCLA Law from 1958 to 1969.  Dean Maxwell "presided over happier, more harmonious years of institutional growth," and it was under his deanship that UCLA became "the youngest top-ranked law school in the country."  Dabagh's successor, Louis Piacenza, was able to grow the law school's library collection to 143,000 volumes by May 1963, which at that time was the 14th largest law school library in the United States.

By 1963, the law school had 600 students in a building designed for 550, and the law building's deficiencies had become all too evident, such as a complete lack of air conditioning.  In October 1963, the law school administration announced a major remodeling and expansion project, which added air conditioning and a new wing to the building. During the 1960s, the law school grew so quickly that the new wing was already insufficient upon its completion in January 1967. From its founding to the end of the 20th century, UCLA Law struggled with severe overcrowding, as librarians, faculty, staff, and as many as 18 student organizations—at one point, more than any other law school in the United States—competed for limited space in the law building for books, classes, conferences, and offices.

The chronic space shortage was ultimately relieved by the addition of a wing for clinical education  and, after four grueling years of construction, completion of the new Hugh and Hazel Darling Law Library on January 22, 2000.

Under Maxwell, the faculty size tripled, from 12 to 37 professors, and the school hired its first female and African-American faculty members. Under Murray Schwartz, who led the school from 1969 to 1975, and William Warren, who served as dean from 1975 to 1982, the school became a pioneer in clinical legal education, developing a skills-based approach that remains among the school’s hallmarks.

Students, too, broke new ground. In 1973, they created a network of student-run legal clinics first known as El Centro Legal de Santa Monica, which continues to provide pro bono services around Los Angeles with 15 separate clinics.

In the 1990s and through subsequent years, the school established several "centers of excellence" that focus on education and advocacy in specific fields.

Academics
UCLA Law has approximately 1,000 students in its Juris Doctor (J.D.) program and 200 students in its Master of Laws (LL.M.) program, which is popular among foreign students intending to take the California bar exam. It also offers a Doctor of Juridical Science (S.J.D.) program for students who already have a J.D. and hope to become law professors, as well as a Master of Legal Studies program for those who do not seek a law degree, but find a legal education an important complement to their professional obligations.

The school was a pioneer in clinical legal education and today offers a strong experiential education program. Through clinical courses and related offerings, the school gives students the opportunity to directly represent clients in a variety of settings while under expert supervision. UCLA Law's clinics also provide service to many people who cannot afford to pay for their own legal services, including veterans, the homeless, and indigent individuals appearing in criminal and immigration courts. In 2017, the school opened the Documentary Film Legal Clinic and Music Industry Clinic, which provide legal services to aspiring visual journalists, musicians and entrepreneurs in the arts, and the Veterans Justice Clinic at the West Los Angeles VA Medical Center.

Students can elect to specialize in business law and policy, entertainment law, environmental law, public interest law, critical race studies, and law and philosophy. The roughly 300 students who begin law school at UCLA every year are divided into sections to encourage a sense of community. Students take all of their first year courses with their sections.

Several joint degree programs are available, which require four years of study and result in the simultaneous award of a Juris Doctor and master's degree in Afro-American studies, American Indian studies, law and management; public health; public policy; philosophy, social welfare, and urban planning.

Faculty and students

UCLA School of Law has a faculty of over 100 members with expertise in all major disciplines of law, representing "one of the most diverse in the country." Thirteen members of the school's tenured faculty have been recognized for being the most-cited scholars in their areas of specialty. The school faculty is ranked 11th for scholarship, up from 15th in 2010 and 13th in 2013.

In 2021, 7,976 students applied to attend UCLA Law, and 366 were enrolled. The average LSAT score for members of the entering class in 2021 is 170. The average GPA for members of the entering class in 2020 is 3.82.

Location

UCLA School of Law is located on the UCLA campus in the Westwood area of Los Angeles.

The school proper is housed in a three-story brick building, with the library tower extending to four stories. A few offices, including the office of career services, the office of admissions and the office of graduate studies and international programs, are housed in an adjacent building, Dodd Hall.

Rankings

In 2021, U.S. News & World Report ranked UCLA as 14th among U.S. law schools, 4th in environmental law, 7th in trial advocacy, 8th in both corporate law and tax law, and 10th in criminal law.

According to Brian Leiter's law school rankings, UCLA Law ranks 8th in the nation in terms of scholarly impact as measured by academic citations of tenure-stream faculty during the years 2009–2013.

The Hollywood Reporter ranked UCLA the number one school for entertainment law in its inaugural 2012 rankings, 2014 - 2019, and 2021 - 2022.

Bar passage rates
In October 2020, UCLA Law's bar passage rates were 97% in California and 100% in New York.

American Bar Association data shows that more than 95% of 2019 graduates had secured full-time, long-term, JD-required employment within 10 months of graduation.

Journals

Journals and law reviews
 UCLA Law Review
 UCLA Asian/Pacific American Law Journal
 UCLA Chicanx-Latinx Law Review
 UCLA Criminal Justice Law Review
UCLA Disability Law Journal
 UCLA Dukeminier Awards Journal of Sexual Orientation and Gender Identity Law
 UCLA Entertainment Law Review
 UCLA Indigenous Peoples' Journal of Law, Culture & Resistance
UCLA Journal of Environmental Law and Policy
 UCLA Journal of International Law & Foreign Affairs
 UCLA Journal of Islamic and Near Eastern Law
 UCLA Journal of Law & Technology
UCLA National Black Law Journal
UCLA Pacific Basin Law Journal
 UCLA Women's Law Journal

Notable people

Alumni

Academia

 Drucilla Cornell – professor, Rutgers University, in political science, comparative literature, and women's studies (2001–); former professor of law at Benjamin N. Cardozo School of Law (1989–1994) and Rutgers School of Law–Newark (1994–2001)
 Joshua Dressler – professor, Moritz College of Law, Ohio State University (2001–); prominent author in criminal law and criminal procedure
 Richard D. Freer – professor, Emory University School of Law (1983–); expert in civil procedure
 Eric Goldman – professor, Santa Clara University School of Law (2006-); expert in Internet law
 Richard L. Hasen – professor, UCLA School of Law (2022-); former Chancellor's Professor, University of California, Irvine School of Law (2011–2022); expert in election law and campaign finance
 Laurie L. Levenson – professor, Loyola Law School; TV legal commentator, gained fame during Rodney King and O.J. Simpson trials
 Susan Westerberg Prager – former Dean of the School of Law (1982–1998) – one of the first female law school deans; Professor at the UCLA School of Law (1972–1998, 2001–2006); Provost of Dartmouth College (1998–2001); President of Occidental College (2006–2007), Executive Director of Association of American Law Schools (2008–2013); Dean of Southwestern Law School (2013–)
 Dean Spade –  lawyer, writer, trans activist, and associate professor of law at Seattle University School of Law
 Eugene Volokh – UCLA Law professor, legal commentator and expert in constitutional law

Business and private practice
 Leslie Abramson – criminal defense attorney who defended Lyle and Erik Menendez and Phil Spector
Ann Baskins – General Counsel, Hewlett-Packard (2000–2006)
 Harland Braun – criminal defense attorney who defended John Landis and George Folsey Jr. against manslaughter charges in the Twilight Zone: The Movie case
Antonia Hernández – president and CEO of the California Community Foundation, former president and general counsel, MALDEF
 John Howard – director of the National Institute for Occupational Safety and Health (2002–2008, 2009–)
 Stewart Kwoh – founder and executive director of the Asian Pacific American Legal Center
 Brian Lee – entrepreneur, founder of LegalZoom and The Honest Company
 Abraham M. Lurie, developer of Marina del Rey
 Stewart Resnick – president and CEO of The Wonderful Company
 Michael Rich – president and CEO, RAND Corp.
 Nelson Rising – real estate development executive, former CEO of Catellus Development Corporation 
 Martine Rothblatt – co-founder of PanAmSat and Sirius Satellite Radio, founder of United Therapeutics
 David P. Steiner – CEO, Waste Management, Inc (2004-)
Stacey Snider – Chair and CEO, Twentieth Century Fox Film (2015-)
Leo Terrell – civil rights attorney, talk radio host and television personality

Entertainment

 Sondra E. Berchin – entertainment lawyer and executive vice president for MCA Universal; also first UCLA Law grad to clerk at the Supreme Court of the United States
 Thomas Bliss – motion picture producer with credits on over 30 films, including The Hurricane and Air Force One
 John Branca –  entertainment lawyer who specializes in representing rock and roll acts, as well as independent investors, music publishing catalogs, and independent music labels
 Jeff Cohen – entertainment lawyer best known for work as child actor in The Goonies (1985)
 Blye Pagon Faust –- Academy Award-winning film producer best known for Spotlight (2015)
 Robert Fitzpatrick – entertainment attorney, film producer, and music executive; President of Allied Artists International
 Cynthia Gouw – television show host, news anchor, reporter, actress, and model
 Chip Johannessen – writer and producer for several popular television shows
 John Kerr - Tony Award-winning actor best known for Tea and Sympathy
 Kalyanee Mam – director and producer of the award-winning documentary A River Changes Course
 George Mastras – Emmy Award-winning writer and producer of AMC's Breaking Bad
 Stephan Pastis – creator of the comic strip Pearls Before Swine
 Kelly Perdew – winner of Season 2 of The Apprentice
 Robert Rotstein – entertainment attorney and novelist
 Stacey Snider – formerly served as co-chair or chair of three film studios: 20th Century Fox, DreamWorks, and Universal
 Howard K. Stern –  entertainment lawyer who was the former domestic partner, attorney and agent of model and actress Anna Nicole Smith.
 Lauren Woodland – Emmy Award-nominated actress
 Ken Ziffren – entertainment attorney, L.A. film czar

Government and politics
 Stewart Baker – Assistant Secretary for Policy, U.S. Department of Homeland Security (2005–2009)
 Howard Berman – United States Congressman from California
 Peter Carlisle – Former Mayor of Honolulu (2010–2013) and Prosecuting Attorney of Honolulu (1996–2010)
 Anna Caballero – Secretary of the California State and Consumer Services Agency (2011–2016), member of the California State Assembly (2006–2010, 2016-)
 Lou Correa – California State Assemblyman, 69th District (1998–2004); California State Senator, 34th District (2006–2014); member of the U.S. House of Representatives from California's 46th Congressional District (2016-)
 David Dawson – member from the 14th District, Iowa House of Representatives (2013–)
Janet Dhillon –  member of the Equal Employment Opportunity Commission (2017–)
 Roger Dickinson – member of the California State Assembly (2010–2014)
 Mike Eng – member of the California State Assembly (2006–2012)
 Lorena Gonzalez Fletcher - member of the California State Assembly (2013-)
 Kirsten Gillibrand – United States Senator from New York (2009-)
 Rachel Goslins – executive director, President's Committee on the Arts and Humanities (2009–2016)
 Casey Gwinn – San Diego City Attorney, (1996–2004)
 José Huizar – member from the 14th District, Los Angeles City Council, (2005–2020). Huizar was arrested and indicted on June 23, 2020, on federal corruption charges.
 Andrei Iancu – Under Secretary of Commerce for Intellectual Property and director of the United States Patent and Trademark Office (USPTO) (2018-)
 George David Kieffer – president, Board of Governors, California Community Colleges (1983–1985) and chair, Regents of the University of California (2017-)
 Susan Liebeler – Commissioner (1984–1988) and Chairman (1986–1988), United States International Trade Commission 
 Jerry M. Patterson – member of the U.S. House of Representatives from California's 38th Congressional District (1975–1985)
 James E. Rogan – California State Assemblyman, 43rd District (1994–1996); Congressman from California's 27th Congressional District (1997–2001); Under Secretary of Commerce for Intellectual Property and director of the USPTO (2001–2004); Judge of the Los Angeles Superior Court (2006–)
 Linda Sánchez – Congresswoman from California's 39th Congressional District (2002–)
 Henry A. Waxman – Congressman from California's 30th Congressional District (1975–2013)
 Jack Weiss – member, Los Angeles City Council (2001–2009)
 Joshua D. Wright – commissioner, Federal Trade Commission (2013–15)

Judiciary
 Percy Anderson – United States district judge on the U.S. District Court for the Central District of California (2002–)
 John Arguelles – associate justice, Supreme Court of California (1987–1989)
 Stanley Blumenfeld – United States district judge on the U.S. District Court for the Central District of California (2020–)
 Janice Rogers Brown – former judge, D.C. Circuit Court of Appeals (2005–2017); former Associate Justice of the Supreme Court of California (1996–2005)
 Joe Brown – former judge of the Criminal Court of the Thirtieth Judicial District of Tennessee (Shelby County); star of court show Judge Joe Brown (1998–2013)
 David O. Carter – United States district judge on the U.S. District Court for the Central District of California (1998–)
 Audrey B. Collins – associate justice, California Court of Appeal for the Second Appellate District (2014-); former United States district judge on the U.S. District Court for the Central District of California (1994–2014)
Dale A. Drozd – United States district judge on the United States District Court for the Eastern District of California (2015–) and former Chief United States Magistrate Judge of the same court (1997–2015).
 Gil Garcetti – Former Los Angeles County District Attorney (1992–2000)
 Dolly M. Gee – United States district judge on the U.S. District Court for the Central District of California (2010-)
 Andrew Guilford – United States district judge on the U.S. District Court for the Central District of California (2006-)
 Philip S. Gutierrez – United States district judge on the U.S. District Court for the Central District of California (2007-)
 Sandra Ikuta – judge, Ninth Circuit Court of Appeals (2006–)
 Robert Clive Jones – Chief Judge, U.S. District Court for the District of Nevada (2003–)
 William B. Keene – Former California Superior Court Judge and presiding judge on the court show Divorce Court.
 William Duffy Keller – United States district judge on the U.S. District Court for the Central District of California (1984–)
 Alex Kozinski – Chief Judge, Ninth Circuit Court of Appeals (1985–2017)
 Alicia Limtiaco – United States Attorney of Guam
 Jeffrey T. Miller – judge, U.S. District Court for the Southern District of California (1997–2010), Senior Judge (2010–)
 Salvador Mendoza Jr. – judge, Ninth Circuit Court of Appeals (2022–); former United States district judge on the U.S. District Court for the Eastern District of Washington (2014-)
 Dorothy Wright Nelson – Senior Judge, Ninth Circuit Court of Appeals (1979–); former Dean of the University of Southern California School of Law (1969–1980)
 Jacqueline Nguyen – judge, Ninth Circuit Court of Appeals (2012–), United States district judge on the United States District Court for the Central District of California (2009–2012)
 Fred W. Slaughter – judge, U.S. District Court for the Central District of California (2022–)
 Kim McLane Wardlaw – judge, Ninth Circuit Court of Appeals (1998–)
 Paul J. Watford – judge, Ninth Circuit Court of Appeals (2012–)

Sports

 Val Ackerman – former basketball player, first female president of USA Basketball (2005–2008); President of the WNBA (1996–2005)
 Cara Dunne-Yates – blind Paralympic athlete
 Julie Heldman (born 1945) – tennis player, ranked # 5 in the world

Other
 Vincent Bugliosi – Attorney and writer of non-fiction works as Helter Skelter and The Betrayal of America: How the Supreme Court Undermined the Constitution and Chose Our President.
 Lowell Milken – co-founder and chairman of the Milken Family Foundation
 Karen I. Tse – human rights activist and social entrepreneur

Faculty

Current
 Khaled Abou El Fadl – Omar and Azmeralda Alfi Distinguished Professor of Law and expert in Islamic Jurisprudence; Chairman of Islamic Studies Department at UCLA
 Stephen Bainbridge – expert on corporations and business law
Ann E. Carlson – expert on U.S. environmental law and policy
 Kimberlé Crenshaw – founding coordinator of the "Critical Race Theory Workshop" movement; Also teaches at Columbia Law School
 Richard L. Hasen – expert in election law and campaign finance; Director, Safeguarding Democracy Project
Jill R. Horwitz – expert on health law, economics, and policy as well as the law of nonprofit organization
 Lynn M. LoPucki – Security Pacific Bank Professor of Law. LoPucki's Bankruptcy Research Database provides data for empirical work bankruptcy
 Hiroshi Motomura – expert on immigration law
 David Nimmer – expert on copyright law
 Frances Olsen – expert on feminist legal theory
 Seana Shiffrin – expert on philosophy of law
 Eugene Volokh – author of textbooks on First Amendment law and academic legal writing; author of over 45 law review articles; founder of The Volokh Conspiracy blog
 Adam Winkler – Author of Gunfight: The Battle over the Right to Bear Arms in America and We the Corporations: How Corporate America Won Its Civil Rights
 Ken Ziffren – entertainment attorney, L.A. film czar, founder of UCLA Law's Ziffren Center for Media, Entertainment, Technology and Sports Law

Former
Richard L. Abel – member of the faculty since 1974; expert on sociology of law
Brainerd Currie – professor (1949–1952); expert on the conflict of laws in the United States
 Jesse Dukeminier – professor (1963–2003); expert on property law, wills, trusts, and estates
 James L. Malone – associate dean (1961–1967); later became Assistant Secretary of State for Oceans and International Environmental and Scientific Affairs (1981–1985)
 Mari Matsuda – first female Asian-American law professor to obtain tenure at any law school in the United States, while teaching at UCLA Law in 1998
 Richard C. Maxwell – Dean of the School of Law (1958–1969)
 Jennifer Mnookin – expert on evidence (law) (2005–2022), became chancellor of the University of Wisconsin–Madison in 2022
 Melville B. Nimmer – professor (1962–1985); expert on U.S. copyright law and father of David Nimmer
 Cruz Reynoso – professor (1991–2001), former Associate Justice of the Supreme Court of California (1982–1987)
 Michael H. Schill – dean and professor (2004–2009), expert on property law and urban planning; became president of the University of Oregon in 2015 and president of Northwestern University in 2022
 Lynn Stout – professor (2001–2012); expert on corporate law, securities, and derivatives

References

External links
 

California, Los Angeles
Law school
Educational institutions established in 1949
Environmental law schools
1949 establishments in California